Ana Rita Esgário (born July 26, 1958) is a Brazilian  politician. She represented Espírito Santo in the Federal Senate from 2011 to 2015. She is a member of the Workers' Party.

References

1958 births
Living people
People from Espírito Santo
Workers' Party (Brazil) politicians
Members of the Federal Senate (Brazil)
Brazilian women in politics